Sellars is a surname, and may refer to

 Bill Sellars (1925–2018), British television producer
 Billy Sellars (1907–1987), English footballer
 Doug Sellars (1961–2011), Canadian television executive
 Elizabeth Sellars (1921–2019), British actress
 Ernie Sellars (1890–1955), Australian rules footballer
 Harry Sellars (1902–1978), English footballer who played for Stoke City
 Herbert Sellars (1896–1918), British First World War flying ace
 James Sellars (1843–1888), Scottish architect
 Jerell Sellars, English footballer who played for Aston Villa
 John Sellars (academic administrator), president of Graceland University
 John Sellars (footballer) (1924–1985), English footballer who played for Stoke City
 Les Sellars, Australian rugby league footballer
 Luke Sellars (born 1981), Canadian professional ice hockey player
 M. R. Sellars (born 1962), American writer
 Mandy Sellars (born 1975), British woman possibly afflicted with Proteus syndrome
 Marilyn Sellars (born 1944), American country music and gospel singer
 Michiko Sellars (born 1985), stage name MiChi, Japanese British pop singer
 Peter Sellars (born 1957), American theatre director
 Richard B. Sellars (1915–2010), former chairman and CEO of Johnson & Johnson
 Roy Wood Sellars (1880–1973), Canadian-American philosopher
 Scott Sellars (born 1965), English footballer
 Wilfrid Sellars (1912–1989), American philosopher, son of Roy Wood Sellars

See also
 Sellar
 Sellers (disambiguation)